There are several rivers named Caracol River or El Caracol River.

Brazil
 Caracol River (Mato Grosso do Sul)
 Caracol River (Rio Grande do Sul)
 Caracol River (Paraná)
 Caracol River (Rondônia)
 Caracol River (Tocantins)

Chile
 El Caracol River (Chile)

Costa Rica
 El Caracol River (Costa Rica)

Ecuador
 Caracol River (Ecuador)

El Salvador
 Caracol River (El Salvador)

Honduras
 El Caracol River (Honduras)

Guatemala
 El Caracol River (Guatemala)

Peru 
 Caracol River (Peru)

See also
 Caracol (disambiguation)